Purmerul Peak is the ice-covered peak rising to 1915 m in the west foothills of Bruce Plateau on Loubet Coast in Graham Land, Antarctica.  It has steep and partly ice-free south and west slopes, and surmounts Hamblin Glacier to the southwest and Hugi Glacier to the north.

The peak is named after the Thracian god Purmerul.

Location
British mapping in 1976.

Maps
British Antarctic Territory. Scale 1:200000 topographic map. DOS 610 Series, Sheet W 66 64. Directorate of Overseas Surveys, Tolworth, UK, 1976.
 Antarctic Digital Database (ADD). Scale 1:250000 topographic map of Antarctica. Scientific Committee on Antarctic Research (SCAR). Since 1993, regularly upgraded and updated.

Notes

References
 Bulgarian Antarctic Gazetteer. Antarctic Place-names Commission. (details in Bulgarian, basic data in English)
 Purmerul Peak. SCAR Composite Gazetteer of Antarctica

External links
 Purmerul Peak. Copernix satellite image

Mountains of Graham Land
Bulgaria and the Antarctic
Loubet Coast